Kate Roberts (13 February 1891 – 14 April 1985) was one of the foremost Welsh-language authors of the 20th century. Styled Brenhines ein llên (The Queen of our Literature), she is known mainly for her short stories, but also wrote novels. Roberts was a prominent Welsh nationalist.

Life
Kate Roberts was born in the village of Rhosgadfan, on the slopes of Moel Tryfan, Caernarfonshire (Gwynedd today). She was the oldest child of Owen Roberts, a quarryman in the local slate industry, and Catrin Roberts. She had two half-sisters and two half-brothers (John Evan, Mary, Jane and Owen) from earlier marriages of her parents, and three younger brothers (Richard, Evan and David). She was born in the family cottage, Cae'r Gors. Later the life in the cottage and village made an all-important backdrop to her early literary work. Her autobiographical volume Y Lôn Wen is a memorable portrayal of the district in that period.

She attended the council school at Rhosgadfan from 1895 to 1904, and Caernarfonshire School from 1904 to 1910. She went on to graduate in Welsh at the University College of North Wales, Bangor, which she attended from 1910 to 1913 under John Morris-Jones and Ifor Williams, and trained as a teacher. She taught in various schools in Wales (Dolbadarn Elementary School 1913–1914, Ystalyfera County School 1915–1917, and County Girls' School, Aberdare 1917–1928).

Roberts met Morris T. Williams at Plaid Cymru (the Welsh nationalist party) meetings, and married him in 1928. Williams was a printer, and eventually they bought the printing and publishing house Gwasg Gee (The Gee Press), Denbigh, and moved to live in the town in 1935. The press published books, pamphlets and the Welsh-language weekly Y Faner (The Banner), for which Roberts wrote regularly. After her husband's death in 1946, she ran the press for another ten years.

In 1965 Roberts bought Cae'r Gors and presented it to the nation, but at the time there was not enough money to restore it. It was not restored until 2005, after a long campaign to raise the money. It is now in the care of Cadw as a museum presentation of Roberts.

She remained in Denbigh after her retirement and died in 1985.

Same-sex activity 
Alan Llwyd's 2011 biography of Roberts used diaries and letters to shed fresh light on her private life and her relationship with Morris. Llwyd suggests that Roberts may have had Lesbian tendencies. For example, Roberts sent a letter to her husband describing the joy she felt when kissing another woman in Pontardawe, saying that "Nothing had ever made her more happy"

Work
It was the death of her brother in the First World War that led Roberts to writing. She used her literary work as a help in coming to terms with her loss.

Her first volume of short stories, O gors y bryniau (From the Swamp of the Hills), appeared in 1925. Perhaps her most successful book of short stories is Te yn y grug (Tea in the Heather) (1959), a series about children. Of the novels that Roberts wrote, the most famous may have been Traed mewn cyffion (Feet in Chains) (1936), which reflected the hard life of a slate-quarrying family. The book was awarded a prize at the National Eiseddfod of Wales in Neath in 1934. She won the prize jointly with Grace Wynne Griffith and her novel Creigiau Milgwyn. However it was alleged that Creigiau Milgwyn was unworthy of the prize according to the historian Thomas Richards.

In 1960 Roberts published Y lôn wen, a volume of autobiography.

Most of her novels and short stories are set in the region where she lived in North Wales. She herself said that she derived the material for her work "from the society in which I was brought up, a poor society in an age of poverty... [where] it was always a struggle against poverty. But notice that the characters haven't reached the bottom of that poverty, they are struggling against it, afraid of it."

Thus her work deals with the uneventful lives of humble people and how they deal with difficulties and disillusionments. It is remarkable for the richness of her language and for her perception. The role of women in society and progressive ideas about life and love are major themes.

Roberts also struck up a literary relationship with Saunders Lewis, which they maintained through letters over a period of forty years. These letters give a picture of life in Wales during the period and record the comments of two literary giants on events at home and abroad.

Many of her works have been translated into other languages.

Selected works

In Welsh
Traed Mewn Cyffion (Feet in Chains) (1936), novel. Llandysul: Gwasg Gomer, 2001 
Ffair Gaeaf a storïau eraill (Winter Fair and other stories) (1937), short stories Denbigh: Gwasg Gee, 2000. 
Stryd y Glep (Gossip Row) (1949), novella. Bethesda: Gwasg Gee, 2011 
Y Byw Sy'n Cysgu (The Living That Sleep) (1956), novel. Denbigh: Gwasg Gee, 1995 
Te yn y Grug (Tea in the Heather) (1959). Short stories. Llandysul: Gwasg Gee, 2004 
Y Lôn Wen (The White Lane) (1960). Autobiography. Denbigh: Gwasg Gee, 2000 
Tywyll Heno (Dark Tonight) (1962). Novella. Denbigh: Gwasg Gee, 2010 
Prynu Dol (Buy Doll and other stories) (1969). Short stories. Denbigh: Gwasg Gee, 2001 
Ifans, Dafydd (Ed.) (1992), Annwyl Kate, Annwyl Saunders: Gohebiaeth, 1923–1983 (Dear Kate, Dear Saunders: Correspondence, 1923–1983). Aberystwyth: National Library of Wales  The letters of Kate Roberts and Saunders Lewis

In translation
Traed Mewn Cyffion (Feet in Chains) (1936), novel translated and annotated by Katie Gramich. Cardigan: Parthian Books, 2012 
Kate Roberts, Feet in Chains, translated by John Idris Jones. Bridgend: Seren, 2002 
Kate Roberts, Sun and Storm and other stories. Denbigh: Gwasg Gee, 2001 
Kate Roberts, Tea in the Heather, translated by Wyn Griffith. Bridgend: Seren, 2002 
Kate Roberts, The Awakening, translation of Y Byw Sy'n Cysgu by Sian James (novelist), Seren, 2006 
Kate Roberts (1991), The World of Kate Roberts: selected stories, 1925–1981, translated by Joseph P. Clancy. Philadelphia: Temple University Press, 1991 . An introduction to her short stories in English, including a translation of Te yn y Grug (Tea in the Heather)
Kate Roberts, Y Lôn Wen, Darn o hunangofiant (The White Lane, A fragment of autobiography), translated by Gillian Clarke, parallel texts English and Welsh. Llandysul: Wasg Gormer, 2009

References

Sources
Thomas Parry (1955), A History of Welsh Literature. Translated by H. Idris Bell. Oxford: Clarendon Press
"Kate Roberts (1891–1985)" in Meic Stephens, ed. (1998), The New Companion to the Literature of Wales. Cardiff: University of Wales Press 
Katie Gramich: Kate Roberts, Cardiff: University of Wales Press, 2011.

External links
Kate Roberts on the BBC Wales website
Cae'r Gors – A Heritage Center of Kate Roberts

1891 births
1985 deaths
People from Denbigh
Alumni of Bangor University
Welsh children's writers
British children's writers
Welsh-language writers
Welsh short story writers
British women short story writers
British women children's writers
British women novelists
20th-century Welsh novelists
20th-century British women writers
People from Caernarfonshire
20th-century British short story writers